The golden-eyed flowerpiercer (Diglossa glauca), also known as the deep-blue flowerpiercer, is a species of bird in the tanager family Thraupidae. It is found in humid Andean forests in Colombia, Ecuador, Peru and Bolivia. It is the only species of flowerpiercer with bright yellow eyes.

References 

golden-eyed flowerpiercer
Birds of the Northern Andes
golden-eyed flowerpiercer
golden-eyed flowerpiercer
golden-eyed flowerpiercer
Taxonomy articles created by Polbot